Music Maker Relief Foundation is an American non-profit, based in Hillsborough, North Carolina. Music Maker Relief Foundation was founded in 1994 by Tim and Denise Duffy to "help the true pioneers and forgotten heroes of Southern music gain recognition and meet their day-to-day needs. Music Maker presents these musical traditions to the world so American culture will flourish and be preserved for future generations."

History

Early years
In 1989, while completing his studies for a master's degree in Folklore at the University of North Carolina at Chapel Hill, Tim Duffy was documenting blues musician James "Guitar Slim" Stephens for the university's Southern Folklife Collection. Stephens's health was in decline, and shortly before his death, he advised Duffy to locate a musician named Guitar Gabriel.

After his graduation, Duffy began working as a substitute teacher at a middle school in Winston-Salem, hearing an assortment of folkloric tales about Guitar Gabriel from students, until one student volunteered that Gabriel was her neighbor, living in the government housing projects of Winston-Salem. That evening, Duffy followed the student's directions to a "drink house" in the neighborhood, where he met Gabriel's nephew, Hawkeye, who took him to meet Gabriel. Duffy forged a close friendship with Gabriel, and the two began recording and performing under the name Guitar Gabriel & Brothers in the Kitchen, releasing the album Do You Know What it Means to Have a Friend? (also known as Toot Blues) on their own Karibu label in 1991.

Gabriel had been inactive in the music industry since the 1970 release of his album My South, My Blues (as Nyles Jones) on the Gemini label. He had received no royalties  and was impoverished. He required almost daily assistance from Duffy, who provided transportation to medical appointments, money, and food for Gabriel and his wife. Through Gabriel, Tim and Denise Duffy made field recordings of other local blues musicians, such as Captain Luke, Macavine Hayes, Mr. Q., and Willa Mae Buckner. They lived in poor conditions and needed regular assistance. Duffy thought their culture was slipping away unnoticed by the music industry.

Tim Duffy's father, Allen Duffy, a lawyer, had represented and won a case for audio pioneer Mark Levinson, allowing him to continue working in the hi-fi industry. Levinson heard about Tim Duffy's field recordings, some reminiscent of the work of John and Alan Lomax, and invited Duffy to visit his stereo showroom in New York. After hearing the recordings, as well as the stories of the many destitute musicians, Levinson offered to remaster the tapes, which became an eight-artist CD anthology of traditional North Carolina blues entitled A Living Past. Levinson became a crusader for the cause, and solicited funds and industry connections from his friends and colleagues, which, in 1994, resulted in the incorporation of the Music Maker Relief Foundation.

1995–present
In 1995, Tim Duffy met Eric Clapton in a Manhattan bistro, sharing some of his field recordings, as well as the philosophy and goals of the foundation, after which Clapton became a supporter, introducing artists such as B.B. King, Pete Townshend, Bonnie Raitt, Ron Wood, Lou Reed and Rosanne Cash, all of whom donated to the Music Maker Relief Foundation. Duffy was invited to the Los Angeles studio where B.B. King's album Deuces Wild was recorded and where he met Taj Mahal, who contributed to the foundation's growth and success.

By 1996, after receiving several sizable donations, Music Maker Relief Foundation had established the Musician Sustenance, Musical Development, and Cultural Access Programs, which provide food, monetary assistance, transportation to doctor's appointments and to pick up medications, home repairs (in some cases, extremely poor living conditions have warranted the relocation of the musician), performance bookings in professional venues, such as the Lincoln Center and Carnegie Hall, as well as European tours and music festivals worldwide. The success of the programs is due, in large part, to Taj Mahal, who by 1997 had become an advisory board member, artistic consultant, contributor, and co-producer for many of the artists' records. Taj Mahal headlined blues festivals in support of Music Maker, was instrumental in securing advertising in mainstream print media, as well as the creation of the "Fishin' Blues Tournament", which raises funds for the foundation. Over the next several years, many new donors and contributors were involved, allowing Duffy to expand the roster of the label, and to release over one hundred albums, the proceeds of which the artists keep, in their entirety. Many of the label's artists have been documented in the collaborative work of artists Harvey Pekar and Gary Dumm, who have contributed artwork since 2003, and whose work was featured in a 2010 calendar, created as a fundraiser for Music Maker Relief Foundation.

In 2006, Tim Duffy saw the Carolina Chocolate Drops performing at the Shakori Hills Grassroots Festival of Music and Dance in Silk Hope, North Carolina. Duffy signed a management deal with the group and released their debut record, Dona Got a Ramblin' Mind on the Music Maker Label. During Duffy's time as manager the Carolina Chocolate Drops won a Grammy Award in 2010 for Best Traditional Folk Album with their first album on Nonesuch Records, Genuine Negro Jig. The Chocolate Drops second release with Nonesuch, Leaving Eden was nominated for a Grammy.

In 2014, the Music Maker Relief Foundation celebrated its 20th anniversary with an exhibit of 28 photographs of Music Maker artists. The exhibit was previewed at the New York Public Library for the Performing Arts. A double-disc compilation album and 144-page photo book is also set to be released in honor of the foundation's anniversary.

On October 27, 2014 PBS NewsHour aired segment on the Music Maker Relief Foundation, showing William R. Ferris say, "They provide a model for what our nation should be doing. The New Deal under FDR did this for the entire nation, and Tim Duffy thankfully is doing it for the community of blues artists."

Artists

 Little Pink Anderson
 Harvey Arnold
 Etta Baker
 Robert Belfour
 Adolphus Bell
 The Branchettes
 Skeeter Brandon
 Essie Mae Brooks
 Tommy Brown
 Cora Mae Bryant
 Precious Bryant
 Willa Mae Buckner
 Randy Burns
 Dr. G. B. Burt
 Lil' Joe Burton
 David Butler
 Carolina Chocolate Drops
 Pat "Mother Blues" Cohen
 Robert Lee Coleman
 The Como Mamas
 George Conner
 George Daniels
 James B. Davis
 Ardie Dean
 Ernie K-Doe
 Drink Small
 Paul Duffy
 Mr. Frank Edwards
 Pura Fé
 Cool John Ferguson
 Robert Finley
 Dom Flemons
 Benton Flippen
 Cora Fluker
 Sam Frazier Jr.
 Preston Fulp
 Guitar Gabriel
 Lee Gates
 The Giddens Sisters
 Elder James Goins
 Boo Hanks
 Macavine Hayes
 Big Boy Henry
 George Higgs
 Algia Mae Hinton
 Carl Hodges
 John Dee Holeman
 Big Ron Hunter
 Ironing Board Sam
 David Johnson
 Elder Anderson Johnson
 Todd Jones
 Kever's Long House Singers
 Little Freddie King
 Pernell King
 Sonny Boy King
 Willie King
 Clyde Langford
 Guitar Lightnin' Lee
 Lucille Lindsay
 Captain Luke
 Bishop Dready Manning
 Marie Manning
 William Maxwell
 Jerry "Boogie" McCain
 Leyla McCalla
 Dave McGraw & Mandy Fer
 Rufus McKenzie
 Nora Milner
 W.C. Minger IV
 Mudcat
 Chicago Bob Nelson
 Sonny Boy Nelson
 Bubba Norwood
 Jack Owens
 Neal Pattman
 Pinetop Perkins
 Abe Reid
 Jahue Rorie
 Carl Rutherford
 Cueselle Settle (Mr. Q.)
 Larry Shores
 Patrick Sky
 Slewfoot
 Alabama Slim
 Albert Smith
 Sol
 Cootie Stark
 James "Guitar Slim" Stephens
 Samuel Turner Stevens
 Sweet Betty
 Robert Thomas
 Eddie Tigner
 Reverend Perry Tillis
 Othar Turner
 Tad Walters
 J. W. Warren
 Beverly Watkins
 Lightnin' Wells
 Pete Whicher
 Whistlin' Britches
 Albert White
 Pat Wilder
 Ernie Williams

Discography

Albums
 1999 : Railroad Bill by Etta Baker (MM7)
 1999 : Sugar Man by Cootie Stark (MM8)
 1999 : Back in Business by Beverly Watkins
 2000 : Rain in Your Life by Essie Mae Brooks (MM15)
 2000 : This Stuff Just Kills Me by Jerry McCain
 2001 : Turn Off the Fear by Carl Rutherford (MM17)
 2001 : Cool John Ferguson by Cool John Ferguson (MM18)
 2001 : Unplugged by Jerry McCain (MM21)
 2002 : Songs from the Roots of America (I & II)
 2002 : Ragged but Right by Lightnin' Wells
 2002 : Carolina Bluesman by Little Pink Anderson (MM24)
 2002 : Cool Yule by Cool John Ferguson (MM29)
 2003 : Guitar Heaven by Cool John Ferguson (MM34)
 2003 : Boogie is My Name by Jerry McCain (MM34)
 2004 : High Steppin' Momma by Clyde Langford (MM45)
 2004 : Follow Your Heart's Desire by Pura Fé (MM48)
 2004 : Musicmakers with Taj Mahal (MM49)
 2004 : Etta Baker with Taj Mahal (MM50)
 2005 : The Last & Lost Blues Survivors (Dixiefrog)
 2005 : Tarboro Blues by George Higgs
 2005 : Mississippi Rubberleg by Adolphus Bell
 2005 : Lee Gates and the Alabama Cotton Kings by Lee Gates
 2005 : Drinkhouse by Macavine Hayes (MM53)
 2005 : Carolina Breakdown by Etta Baker with Cora Phillips (MM56)
 2006 : One Man Band by Adolphus Bell (MM58)
 2006 : Treasure Box (MM61-62-63)
 2006 : John Dee Holeman & The Waifs Band (MM68)
 2006 : Drink House to Church House Vol. 1 (Dixiefrog) with a DVD with John Dee Holeman, Captain Luke, Cool John Ferguson, Macavine Hayes, billed as 'Alabama Slim' and others
 2006 : Rainy Day by George Higgs (MM77)
 2006 : Black Lucy's Deuce by Lee Gates (MM60)
 2006 : Touring With Lucy by Lee Gates
 2006 : Dona Got A Ramblin' Mind by Carolina Chocolate Drops (MM76)
 2007 : Back in Business by Beverly Watkins
 2007 : Soul of the Blues by Albert White
 2007 : Pickin' Low Cotton by Boo Hanks
 2010 : 270 Haystack Rd. by Benton Flippen & The Smokey Valley Boys
 2011 : Rare Traks by Guitar Lightnin' Lee And His Thunder Band (MM145)
 2012 : I Know I've Been Changed by The Giddens Sisters
 2012 : Buffalo Junction by Boo Hanks and Dom Flemons
 2013 : Vari-colored Songs (A Tribute To Langston Hughes) by Leyla McCalla
 2014 : Prospect Hill by Dom Flemons
 2015 : Super Spirit by Ironing Board Sam
 2016 : Albert White and the Rockers by Albert White

Compilation albums
 A Living Past MMCD 9401 (1994)
 Came So Far MMCD 1294
 Expressin' the Blues MMKCD 701 (1999)
 Blues Came to Georgia MMCD 23 (2001)
 Sol - Volume: Blue MMCD 25
 Songs from the Roots of America (Book w/ CD) (2002)
 Songs from the Roots of America II MMCD 28 (2002)
 Music Makers with Taj Mahal (2005)
 Music Maker Treasure Box (2006)
 Blues Sweet Blues (2007)
 Drink House to Church House Vol. 1 (2007) CD/DVD

See also
 List of record labels

References

Further reading
 Duffy, Timothy (ed); Music Makers: Portraits and Songs from the Roots of America – with B.B. King, Hill Street Press, 
 Duffy, Timothy & Duffy, Denise; We Are the Music Makers! (Nautilus Publishing),

External links
 Official site
 Ncarts.org
 Bluesweb.com
 Timothy Duffy Collection, Southern Folklife Collection, University of North Carolina at Chapel Hill

Blues record labels
Non-profit organizations based in North Carolina
Music archives in the United States
American folklore
Appalachian culture in North Carolina